King Solomon's Ring may refer to:
 The Seal of Solomon, a legendary ring
 King Solomon's Ring (book), a book by Konrad Lorenz
 "King Solomon's Ring" (short story), a short story by Roger Zelazny
 The Ring of Solomon, a children's fantasy novel by Jonathan Stroud